Demetrias was an ancient Greek city. Demetrias may also refer to:

 Battle of Demetrias, a 1270s sea battle near the Greek city
 Demetriapolis or Demetrias, an ancient city in Arachosia
 An alternative name for the city of Sicyon in the northern Peloponnesus
 Demetrias in Assyria, an ancient Greek colony in northern Iraq
 Demetrias (beetle), a genus of ground beetle
 Demetrias (daughter  of Anicius Hermogenianus Olybrius), Roman noblewoman of the 5th century